Bissonette is a French surname that may refer to the following people:

Charles Arthur Bissonette (1896–1971) was an American pilot.
Del Bissonette (1899–1972) was an American first baseman, manager and coach in Major League Baseball.
Gregg Bissonette (born 1959) is an American drummer. 
Matt Bissonette (born 1961) is an American bass player and the brother of drummer Gregg Bissonette.

See also 
Bissonnette

French-language surnames